"Time" is a song recorded by American R&B band Free Nationals, American rapper Mac Miller, and American singer Kali Uchis. It was released as a single from the Free Nationals's self-titled debut album on June 12, 2019. It is the first official posthumous release by Miller since his death on September 7, 2018.

Music Video 
The music video for 'Time' was published to the band's YouTube channel on August 1, 2019. The colorful video was animated by BABEKÜHL, a Sydney based creative studio.

Charts

Kate Stewart version

Time is a re make remixed version of the song with British singer-songwriter Kate Stewart, she announced in her Twitter account 2 days before the release of the Remix of the single "Time", which was released on July 2, 2020,  she shared with the link to the song in her SoundCloud account.

References

2019 singles
2019 songs
Mac Miller songs
Kali Uchis songs
Songs released posthumously
Songs written by Mac Miller
Songs written by Kali Uchis